Ontotext is a software company with offices in Europe and USA. It is the semantic technology branch of Sirma Group. Its main domain of activity is the development of software based on the Semantic Web languages and standards, in particular RDF, OWL and SPARQL. Ontotext is best known for the Ontotext GraphDB semantic graph database engine. Another major business line is the development of enterprise knowledge management and analytics systems that involve big knowledge graphs. Those systems are developed on top of the Ontotext Platform that builds on top of GraphDB capabilities for text mining using big knowledge graphs.

Together with BBC, Ontotext developed one of the early large-scale industrial semantic applications, Dynamic Semantic Publishing, starting in 2010.

Ontotext content management systems deliver semantic tagging, classification, recommendation, search and discovery services. Typically they involve semantic data integration that results in a big knowledge graph, which combines proprietary master data with open data and commercially available datasets. These big knowledge graphs are used to provide context about the corresponding domain and semantic profiles of the key concepts and entities in it.

Products 
 Ontotext GraphDB (formerly OWLIM) – a RDF triplestore available in three versions – Free, Standard and Enterprise. GraphDB is optimized for metadata and master data management, graph analytics and data publishing. Since version 8.0 GraphDB integrates OpenRefine to allow for easy ingestion and reconciliation of tabular data
 Ontotext Platform – providing an enrichment suite for text mining and semantic annotation, data integration tools that can transform data into RDF, and tools for semantic curation allowing users to search the knowledge base and curate content at the same time.

Demonstrators 
Ontotext runs several public demonstration services:
 NOW – News On the Web shows how a news feed can be categorized and enriched, implementing semantic faceted search. It demonstrates the capabilities of semantic technology for publishing purposes
 Rank – news popularity ranking of companies. Supports rankings by industry sectors and countries, including subsidiaries. Based on semantic tags that link news articles to big knowledge graph of linked open data
 Fact Forge – hub for open Linked data and news about people, organizations and locations. It includes more than 1 billion facts from popular datasets such as DBpedia, Geonames, Wordnet, the Panama Papers, etc., as well as ontologies such as the Financial Industry Business Ontology (FIBO)
 Linked Life Data – a data-as-a-service platform that provides access to 25 public biomedical databases through a single access point. The service allows writing of complex data analytical queries and answering complex bioinformatics questions. Simply navigate through the information, or export subsets such as 'all approved drugs and their brand names'
 Linked Leaks – Panama Papers leak linked to additional knowledge about the world
Elections – tracking of detailed behaviors in Bulgarian elections, e.g., indicating possible election irregularities

Open source software 
Ontotext has supported the development of the following open source software, starting with EC research projects since 2001:
 RDF4J (formerly Sesame) – an RDF framework for Java, started in On-To-Knowledge
 General Architecture for Text Engineering (GATE) – a NLP framework, developed in SEKT, TAO, MediaCampaign, PrestoSpace.

Research projects 
The company has been involved in over 30 research projects in the European Commission Framework Programmes in the domains of
Semantic Web, Linked Data, Open Data and Text mining. An interactive project timeline is available.

References 

Companies based in Sofia
Companies established in 2000
Bulgarian brands
Software companies of Bulgaria
Semantic Web companies